Quoin Island (also known as As Salamah Island and Great Quoin Island) is the largest of three islands of the As Salamah Archipelago. It is the northernmost landmass of Oman and the traditional waypoint used by ships to define the entrance or exit from the Persian Gulf. Once a ship is declared a position of "Passed Quoin Inbound" the insurance rates for the ship will increase.

Quoin Island, Oman, is not to be confused with Quoin Island, Yemen, which is in the Red Sea and also has a lighthouse, or Quoin Island in the Torres Strait of Australia, neither of which are way points.

References

External links
 maps.google.co.uk

Islands of Oman
Strait of Hormuz